The Vaccines Manufacturing and Innovation Centre (VMIC) is a vaccine research and manufacturing facility under construction in Harwell Science and Innovation Campus in Oxfordshire, England. Announced in December 2018 and originally planned to be opened in 2022, its planned opening date has been brought forward to 2021 as a response to the COVID-19 pandemic.

Organizations collaborating in the centre's development include Imperial College London, the London School of Hygiene and Tropical Medicine, and Oxford University. The UK government provided funding of £93 million for the construction of the centre in 2020, and by March 2021 total funding reached £215m.

Construction of the 7,000 square metre facility at Harwell was begun by main contractor Glencar in April 2020.

In 2020, the centre's personnel contributed to development of the Oxford–AstraZeneca COVID-19 vaccine AZD1222, and from October began medium-scale production.

References

External links 
 

Medical research institutes in the United Kingdom
Research institutes of Imperial College London
Research institutes of the University of Oxford
London School of Hygiene & Tropical Medicine
2021 establishments in the United Kingdom